The Wimbledon World Lawn Tennis Professional Championships also known as the Wimbledon Pro, was a men's tennis tournament held in August 1967. The tournament was sponsored and broadcast by the BBC to mark the invention of colour television. It was the first tournament staged at Wimbledon that was open to male professional tennis players since the British Professional Championships in 1930, and had a prize fund of US$45,000. The singles competition was an eight-man knockout event won by Rod Laver, who received £3,000, whilst the doubles was a four team knockout event won by Andrés Gimeno and Pancho Gonzales.

History
During Wimbledon in 1966, Jack Kramer was doing radio commentary for the BBC when Wimbledon's working chairman Herman David came to the broadcast booth and talked to Kramer and BBC tennis exec Bryan Cowgill to discuss the possibility of making the tournament "open" to both amateurs and pros. The topic had been raised on and off for years. In the summer of 1960 the International Lawn Tennis Federation (ILTF) had met in Paris and voted on open tennis, but the motion, which required 139 out of 209 votes to pass, got only 134 votes, 5 short. By 1966 public interest in tennis had been at a long-sustained low. Cowgill suggested a trial pro tournament at Wimbledon for the following year, and in late August, 1967, the tournament was held at Wimbledon with total prize money of US$35,000 for singles and US$10,000 for doubles, making it the largest prize-money event in tennis history at that time. All matches were played on Centre Court. The Wimbledon Pro tournament was deemed very successful with over 30,000 spectators attending the three days of play.  There was an 8 player draw for singles and a 4 teams draw for doubles, all professionals.

Most of these players had won honours at Wimbledon in their amateur days but had forfeited the right to play there on turning professional. The segregation of the two categories was soon to come to an end. In December 1967, the Annual Meeting of the British Lawn Tennis Association (LTA) voted overwhelmingly to admit players of all categories for the 1968 Wimbledon Championships and other future tournaments in Britain. Faced with a fait accompli the ILTF yielded and allowed each nation to determine its own legislation regarding amateur and professional players.

Draws

Singles

Doubles

See also
Major professional tennis tournaments before the Open Era

References

External links
Pathé Film Reel – Professional Lawn Tennis Doubles Final 1967
 Source for the singles draw at Wimbledon.com
 Source for the doubles draw at Wimbledon.com

Wimbledon Championships
Professional tennis tournaments before the Open Era
August 1967 sports events in the United Kingdom